Chungsan concentration camp (also spelled Jeungsan, Jungsan or Joongsan) is a reeducation camp in North Korea. Its official name is Kyo-hwa-so No. 11 (Reeducation camp no. 11).

Location 
The camp is in Chungsan county, in South Pyongan province of North Korea.

Description 

Chungsan camp is a sprawling largely women's penitentiary with between 3,300 and 5,000 prisoners. Since 1999 the camp is used to detain female defectors, which account for 50–60% of the prisoners, while others are incarcerated for theft, prostitution, unauthorized trade, etc. The camp is surrounded by agricultural plots, where the prisoners have to grow rice and corn for delivery to the Ministry of Public Security.

Human rights situation 
The food rations are very small. According to a former prisoner, one third of the prisoners died from combinations of malnutrition, disease, and forced labor within a year. Dead prisoners are buried in mass graves on a nearby hill. She reported that the prisoners were often beaten with iron bars, if they did not work hard enough. She got very ill, because her wounds from the beatings got infected.

In interviews other former prisoners reported about 
 solitary confinement cells,
 hard work in farming, from 4 a.m. to 7 or 8 p.m. in the farming season,
 a strict system of control and surveillance,
 public executions,
 violent beatings in cases of rule violations.

Prisoners (witnesses) 
 Kim Miran (around 2002–2004 in Chungsan) was repatriated from China for illegal border-crossing.
 An unidentified former prisoner (female, 2004–2005 in Chungsan) gave testimony to HRNK about the camp. She was repatriated from China and imprisoned without a trial for illegal border crossing.
 Ten other unidentified former prisoners (all female) were interviewed by the Database Center for North Korean Human Rights. Most of them do not want to be identified for fear that their relatives in North Korea are punished.

See also 
 Human rights in North Korea
 Kaechon concentration camp
 North Korean defectors

References

External links 
 Committee for Human Rights in North Korea: The Hidden Gulag - Overview of North Korean prison camps with testimonies and satellite photographs
 Database Center for North Korean Human Rights: Prisoners in North Korea Today - Comprehensive explanation of detention facilities in North Korea based on numerous defector testimonies

Concentration camps in North Korea